Shangjing Longquanfu or Sanggyeong Yongcheonbu, also known as Shangjing/Sanggyeong (上京, 상경), Huhan/Holhan Fortress (忽汗城, 홀한성), is an archaeological site in Ning'an, Heilongjiang, China. It was the capital of the Balhae (Bohai) Kingdom from 756 to 785, and again from 793 to 926.

The site has been protected since the 1960s. The Chinese government has established the Bohai Shangjing National Archaeological Park and an archaeological museum at the site.

Dimension
Shangjing was modelled after Chang'an, the capital of the Tang dynasty. It was composed of the outer city, the inner city, and the palace city which enclosed five palaces. It is one of the best preserved medieval capital cities in the world.

History
Balhae was founded at the Dongmo Mountain by Dae Jo-yeong. However, Balhae set up five capitals to rule its territories, and also transferred the main seat of the government several times because stabilizing and strengthening central rule over various ethnic tribes in its realm, which was expanded temporarily. In 756, during the reign of King Mun, Shangjing Longquanfu was established as the permanent capital near Lake Jingpo, south of today's Ning'an, Heilongjiang, China.

See also 
 List of provinces of Balhae

References 

Balhae
Capitals of former nations
National archaeological parks of China
Major National Historical and Cultural Sites in Heilongjiang